Eulepidotis santarema is a moth of the family Erebidae first described by Francis Walker in 1865. It is found in the Neotropics, including the Brazilian state of Amazonas and Guyana.

References

Moths described in 1865
santarema